Megachile pseudomonticola is a species of bee in the family Megachilidae. It was described by Hedicke in 1925.

References

Pseudomonticola
Insects described in 1925